The 2021 Women's Cricket World Cup Qualifier was an international women's cricket tournament that was held in Zimbabwe in November and December 2021. The tournament was the final part of the qualification process for the 2022 Women's Cricket World Cup. All of the regional qualification tournaments used the Women's Twenty20 International format. The tournament was the fifth edition of the World Cup Qualifier, with the fixtures played as 50 overs matches. Originally, the top three teams from the qualifier would have progressed to the 2022 Women's Cricket World Cup in New Zealand. The top three teams, along with the next two best placed teams, also qualified for the next cycle of the ICC Women's Championship.

Originally, the qualifier was scheduled to take place in Sri Lanka from 3 to 19 July 2020. In March 2020, due to the COVID-19 pandemic, the International Cricket Council (ICC) confirmed that they were monitoring the situation and reviewing the scheduling of the tournament. However, on 12 May 2020, the ICC confirmed that the tournament had been postponed. In December 2020, the ICC confirmed that the qualifier would be played during June and July 2021. In April 2021, the ICC postponed the tournament to November and December 2021. In August 2021, the ICC confirmed the dates for the tournament, and that it would be played in Zimbabwe. The full schedule for the tournament was announced in November 2021. The ten teams were placed into two groups of five, with the top three teams from each group advancing to the Super Six stage of the tournament.

On 8 November 2021, Papua New Guinea announced that they had been forced to withdraw due to several players recording positive tests for COVID-19. On 10 November, the ICC confirmed that there would be no replacement team for Papua New Guinea, with Group A reduced to four teams. In late November 2021, a new variant of the COVID-19 virus was discovered in southern Africa, with Cricket Ireland issued a statement saying they were monitoring the situation. Prior to the discovery of the new variant, three members of the Sri Lankan team had tested positive for COVID-19. Their scheduled match against the West Indies, due to take place on 27 November 2021, was cancelled after seven members of the Sri Lankan team tested positive.

Later the same day, the ICC announced that the qualifier tournament had been called off, due to concerns of the new COVID variant and travel restrictions. Per the ICC's playing conditions, the qualification slots were based on the team's ODI rankings, therefore Bangladesh, Pakistan and the West Indies progressed to the 2022 Women's Cricket World Cup, with Sri Lanka and Ireland qualifying for the next ICC Women's Championship. This decision meant that the other teams at the tournament were ineligible for World Cup qualification, as the ICC only grants ODI status to full members, and as such they are not included in the ODI rankings.

Status of matches
In September 2018, ICC chief executive Dave Richardson announced that all matches at ICC World Cup Qualifiers would be awarded One Day International (ODI) status. However, in November 2021, the ICC reversed this decision, and determined that all fixtures in the Women's World Cup Qualifier featuring a team without ODI status would be recorded as a List A match. This followed an announcement retrospectively applying first-class and List A status to women's cricket.

Qualification
The following teams qualified for the tournament:

Papua New Guinea withdrew from the qualifier due to positive COVID-19 tests within the squad.

Squads
The following teams and squads were announced for the tournament. Players marked with an * were named as reserves in their respective sides.

Group stage

Group A

Group B

References

External links
 Series home at ESPNcricinfo

2021-22
Women's Cricket World Cup Qualifier

Women's Cricket World Cup Qualifier
International cricket competitions in Zimbabwe
Cricket World Cup Qualifier
Cricket World Cup Qualifier
Cricket World Cup Qualifier
Sports events curtailed and voided due to the COVID-19 pandemic